is a mountain of the Yūbari Mountains. It is located On the border of Minamifurano, Yūbari, Hokkaidō, Japan.

References
 Geographical Survey Institute
 Yubari-dake Mountain Trail, Charm of Hokkaido

Mountains of Hokkaido